Scott Lee Sutter (born 13 May 1986) is a Swiss footballer who plays as a right-back. Previously he spent 14 years playing in the Swiss Super League for Grasshopper Zürich, FC Zurich and Young Boys and in Major League Soccer for Orlando City SC and Vancouver Whitecaps FC. Sutter has represented Switzerland at the under-21 and the senior level.

Early life
Sutter was born in Enfield, and grew up in Potters Bar, Hertfordshire where his family still live. Sutter is the son of an English-born mother of Polish descent and a Swiss father. He attended Chancellor's School in Brookmans Park, Hertfordshire and was a childhood fan of Tottenham Hotspur.

Career

Grasshopper
Sutter moved to Switzerland in 2002 aged 16 to join Grasshopper Club Zürich. After one year in the U18s and U21s he was called up to the main squad. His first game came aged 18 against Neuchâtel Xamax. He established himself as a first team regular and played in over 80 games including UEFA Cup qualification and group stages in the last two years. At the start of the 2007–08 season Sutter sustained a serious injury to his right ankle and underwent an operation which was successful.

Young Boys
In June 2009 Sutter moved to Young Boys from Grasshopper, signing a contract until June 2012. He scored his first goal for the Bern club on 29 October 2009, in a 7–1 away league victory over Bellinzona. He made appearances for Young Boys in the 2010–11 UEFA Champions League, against Fenerbahçe and Tottenham Hotspur.

In January 2012 Sutter was in talks with English club Blackburn Rovers with regards to a possible transfer. On 14 February 2012 he joined Swiss club FC Zürich on loan till the end of the season.

Orlando City
On 3 March 2017, Sutter was signed by MLS club Orlando City. He made his debut on 1 April, appearing as a substitute away at Columbus Crew before making his first start the following weekend, beating New York Red Bulls 1–0 at home. Sutter's first goal for Orlando and his only one of the 2017 season came on 22 June 2017, heading home a Kaká free kick in stoppage time to earn a 1–1 draw at Seattle.
Between 5 August and 2 September 2018, Sutter had a notably productive goal-spell scoring 3 times in 4 games, 2 of which were stoppage time equalizers against New England Revolution and Philadelphia Union respectively. At the end of the 2018 season the club announced they had declined his contract option, making him a free agent.

Vancouver Whitecaps FC
On 30 January 2019, Sutter joined MLS club Vancouver Whitecaps FC. He was released by Vancouver at the end of the season.

International career
In November 2005, Sutter featured for the Switzerland U21s in a UEFA European Under-21 Championship qualification playoff match against Portugal and played a further youth friendly against Romania the following April. Despite receiving a call up for the Swiss senior team in late 2006, Sutter stated that he no longer wished to be considered for selection for the Swiss national side as he wanted to play for England: "It hit me when I was in a bar supporting England with all my mates, wearing my England shirt and I knew that the next week I was going to be playing for Switzerland. It just didn't feel right. I was English".

However, in August 2010 he accepted another call up for the Swiss squad and made his debut on 3 September as a halftime substitute in a 0–0 friendly draw with Australia after replacing Stephan Lichtsteiner. "Switzerland has given me so much," Sutter said explaining the decision to play for the Swiss national team. "I went through so much with my injury and they gave me the opportunity to play. I would be stupid to turn it down because at one point I didn't think I would play football again. Switzerland is my home but it is also out of gratitude. It is my way of giving something back." He featured in one more international match for Switzerland, a 1–0 away defeat to Montenegro in a qualifier for UEFA Euro 2012.

Career statistics

Club

Statistics accurate as of match played 28 October 2018

International

Notes

Personal
Sutter holds a U.S. green card which qualifies him as a domestic player for MLS roster purposes.

References

External links
 
 Scott Sutter on MLSSoccer.com

1986 births
Living people
Swiss men's footballers
Switzerland international footballers
Switzerland under-21 international footballers
English footballers
Swiss people of Polish descent
English people of Polish descent
English people of Swiss descent
Swiss people of English descent
Grasshopper Club Zürich players
FC Zürich players
BSC Young Boys players
Orlando City SC players
Vancouver Whitecaps FC players
Swiss Super League players
Major League Soccer players
Footballers from Enfield, London
People from Potters Bar
Association football midfielders
Association football fullbacks
English expatriate sportspeople in the United States
Expatriate soccer players in the United States
English expatriate footballers
English expatriate sportspeople in Switzerland